Bulgaria competed at the 1972 Summer Olympics in Munich, West Germany. 130 competitors, 106 men and 24 women, took part in 92 events in 15 sports.

Medalists

Gold
 Georgi Kostadinov — Boxing, Men's Flyweight
 Norair Nurikyan — Weightlifting, Men's Featherweight
 Yordan Bikov — Weightlifting, Men's Middleweight
 Andon Nikolov — Weightlifting, Men's Middle-Heavyweight
 Petar Kirov — Wrestling, Men's Greco-Roman Flyweight
 Georgi Markov — Wrestling, Men's Greco-Roman Featherweight

Silver
 Yordanka Blagoeva — Athletics, Women's High Jump
 Diana Yorgova — Athletics, Women's Long Jump
 Angel Angelov — Boxing, Men's Welterweight
 Mladen Kutchev — Weightlifting, Men's Lightweight
 Atanas Shopov — Weightlifting, Men's Middle-Heavyweight
 Aleksandar Kraitchev — Weightlifting, Men's Heavyweight
 Osman Duraliev — Wrestling, Men's Freestyle Super Heavyweight
 Ognian Nikolov — Wrestling, Men's Freestyle Light-Flyweight
 Stoyan Apostolov — Wrestling, Men's Greco-Roman Lightweight
 Aleksandr Tomov — Wrestling, Men's Greco-Roman Super Heavyweight

Bronze
 Vasilka Stoeva — Athletics, Women's Discus Throw
 Ivanka Khristova — Athletics, Women's Shot Put
 Fedia Damianov & Ivan Burtchin — Canoe / Kayak, Men's Flatwater C-2 1000m (canoe double)
 Ivan Krastev — Wrestling, Men's Freestyle Featherweight
 Stefan Angelov — Wrestling, Men's Greco-Roman Light-Flyweight

Athletics

Men's 5000 metres
Mikhail Jelev
 Heat — DNS (→ did not advance)

Men's High Jump
Petar Bogdanov
 Qualification Round — 2.12m (→ did not advance)

Boxing

Men

Canoeing

Sprint
Men

Women

Cycling

Four cyclists represented Bulgaria in 1972.

Track
1000m time trial

Pursuit

Equestrian

Fencing

Five fencers, all men, represented Bulgaria in 1972.

Men's sabre
 Boris Stavrev
 Stoyko Lipchev
 Anani Mikhaylov

Men's team sabre
 Khristo Khristov, Stoyko Lipchev, Anani Mikhaylov, Valentin Nikolov, Boris Stavrev

Gymnastics

Modern pentathlon

Three male pentathletes represented Bulgaria in 1972.

Men's Individual Competition:
 Georgi Stoyanov — 4695 points (→ 26th place)
 Velko Bratanov — 4339 points (→ 50th place)
 Angel Pepelyankov — 3971 points (→ 57th place)

Men's Team Competition:
 Stoyanov, Bratanov, and Pepelyankov — 12957 points (→ 16th place)

Rowing

Men

Shooting

Six male shooters represented Bulgaria in 1972.
Open

Swimming

Men

Women

Volleyball

Preliminary round

Pool A

|}

|}

Semifinals

|}

Bronze medal match

|}
Team Roster
Dimiter Karov
Brunko Iliev
Alex Trenev
Ivan Ivanov
Dimiter Zlatanov
Zdravko Simeonov
Tsano Tsanov
Kiril Slavov
Emil Vulchev
Emil Trenev
Luchezar Soyanov
Ivan Dimitrov

Water polo

Preliminary round

Pool C

Classification 7th – 12th

Team Roster

 Bisser Naoumov
 Ivan Kovatchev
 Alexander Chpitzer
 Toma Tomov
 Plamen Brankov
 Mladen Khristov
 Nedeltcho Yordanov
 Vassil Tomov
 Andrei Konstantinov
 Matei Popov
 Lubomir Rountov

Weightlifting

Men

Wrestling

References

Nations at the 1972 Summer Olympics
1972 Summer Olympics
1972 in Bulgarian sport